George Comber (12 October 1856 – 18 October 1929) was an undertaker and an English cricketer. He played six first-class matches for Surrey between 1880 and 1885.

See also
 List of Surrey County Cricket Club players

References

External links
 

1856 births
1929 deaths
Cricketers from Redhill, Surrey
English cricketers
British funeral directors
Surrey cricketers